Alfred Scott Anderson, Jr. (July 24, 1904 – November 12, 1971) was an American politician, who was mayor of Richmond, Virginia from 1958 to 1960 and served on the City Council for the City of Richmond, Virginia from 1956 to 1960 and 1963–1966. Anderson, who was too old for military service, served in the Home Guard during World War II.

Legal career
In 1960, Anderson left the law firm of Bowles, Anderson, Boyd, Clarke & Herrod to join Mr. Alexander Hamilton Sands in the forming of Sands, Anderson, Marks & Clarke, whose offices were initially in the American Building. This law firm eventually became Sands Anderson PC.

References

External links
Sands Anderson PC Law Firm Founded by A. Scott Anderson

1904 births
1971 deaths
Mayors of Richmond, Virginia
Richmond, Virginia City Council members
20th-century American politicians
Virginia lawyers
20th-century American lawyers